Soufiane Kourdou (born 21 May 1985) is a Moroccan professional basketball player. He currently plays for the AS Salé club of the FIBA Africa Club Champions Cup and the Nationale 1, Morocco’s first division.

He represented Morocco's national basketball team at the 2017 AfroBasket in Tunisia and Senegal where he was Morocco’s best free throw shooter.

At the 2017 Arab Nations Cup in Egypt, he was the tournament’s dominant scorer as he recorded 18.6 points per game.

BAL career statistics

|-
| style="text-align:left;"|2021
| style="text-align:left;"|AS Salé
| 4 || 0 || 17.6 || .154 || .000 || .667 || 1.8 || 1.0 || .8 ||  .8 || 2.5
|-
|- class="sortbottom"
| style="text-align:center;" colspan="2"|Career
| 4 || 0 || 17.6 || .154 || .000 || .667 || 1.8 || 1.0 || .8 ||  .8 || 2.5

References

External links
 FIBA profile
 Real GM profile
 Afrobasket.com profile

1985 births
Living people
Centers (basketball)
Moroccan men's basketball players
People from Oujda
AS Salé (basketball) players